196th may refer to:

196th (2/1st Highland Light Infantry) Brigade, Territorial Force division of the British Army during the First World War
196th Battalion (Western Universities), CEF, unit in the Canadian Expeditionary Force during the First World War
196th Division (People's Republic of China), military formation of the Chinese People's Volunteer Army
196th Infantry Brigade (United States) ("Chargers"), part of the United States Army Reserve's 98th Division
196th Infantry Regiment (United States), infantry regiment of the United States Army National Guard
196th Ohio Infantry (or 196th OVI), infantry regiment in the Union Army during the American Civil War
196th Reconnaissance Squadron (196 RS), unit of the 163d Reconnaissance Wing of the California Air National Guard
196th Street (Manhattan)
Pennsylvania's 196th Representative District

See also
196 (number)
196 (disambiguation)
196, the year 196 (CXCVI) of the Julian calendar
196 BC